C. Krishna Pillai (1851–1916) was known as Samudayothejakan (Community Lifter) for his service and developmental contributions to the Hindu Nair community.

Biography
Pillai was born in Thiruvananthapuram at Pattom Kushavarkal Mulayarathala house in 1851. His parents were  Padmanabha Pillai and Lakshmi Amma. He passed the B.A. examination in 1875. He soon joined the Education Department of the erstwhile native State of Travancore as a Headmaster in a Malayalam School. He was later promoted to become the Range Inspector of Schools.

Pillai found that the Nair community was beset with many unnecessary customs and traditions that prevented the groups progress. He tried to stop the celebration of such extravagant and ridiculous ceremonies like Thalikettu kalyanam, Therandu kalyanam, Pulikudi, etc. He campaigned for the discontinuation of the out-dated matrilineal system observed by the Nairs. He initiated the Samastha Kerala Nair Samajam meetings for this purpose. He started a monthly newspaper called Samudaya Parishkarini (Community Modifier).

Pillai paved the way for the formation of the Nair Service Society in 1914. He did not survive to witness the growth and development of the society.

References

‘’Mahacharitha Samgraha Sagaram’’ by Pallippattu Kunjukrishnan.

Educators from Kerala
1851 births
1916 deaths
Scholars from Thiruvananthapuram
19th-century Indian educational theorists